The Parallels Plesk Billing software package is a commercial web hosting billing and automation program. Originally released by ModernGigabyte, LLC as ModernBill, the product's name was changed to Parallels Plesk Billing after Parallels, Inc. acquired ModernGigabyte, LLC in January 2008.

Overview
Parallels Plesk Billing allows a server administrator to acquire, provision and manage recurring bill orders for services requested from end customers, with a particular emphasis on domain registration, web hosting, digital certificates and other web-based services and applications. Parallels Plesk Billing integrates through an API with many third-party systems like control panels, domain registrars, payment gateways, and other service providers. Other features include support for template based plans, upgrade/grade options, a la carte resource additions, and suspension/re-enablement based on payment history.

Parallels Plesk Billing utilizes a MySQL database running on PHP 5.x or better.  Parallels Plesk Billing can be installed on any Windows, Linux, or FreeBSD operating system that supports Apache server or Internet Information Services.

Version history

References 

Web hosting